Game Over is an action video game developed by Dinamic Software and published by Imagine Software in 1987. It was released for the Amstrad CPC, Commodore 64, MSX, Thomson TO7, and ZX Spectrum. The game includes some adventure game elements. A prompted unrated sequel, Game Over II, was released in 1987.

Plot

Arkos, a  former loyal lieutenant of the beautiful but evil galactic empress Queen Gremla, became a rebel dedicated to end her cruel tyranny. The first part of the game takes place on the prison planet Hypsis, from which Arkos must try to escape. In the second part, Arkos arrives in the jungle swamp planet Sckunn to infiltrate the queen's palace, defeat her Giant Guardian robot, and assassinate her.

Reception
Controversy arose around the presence of a visible nipple on the advertising and inlay artwork, which had originally appeared on the cover of Heavy Metal (May 1984 - Vol.8 No.2) called Cover Ere Comprimee and is attributed to Luis Royo. Oliver Frey, the art editor for Crash magazine, painted over the original bare-breasted image with a thin grey corset so that it could be printed, but retailers demanded that logos be placed over the nipple. Game Over won the awards for best advert and best inlay of the year, according to the readers of Crash.

The game itself was mostly well received. Computer & Video Games awarded it 8/10 for the ZX Spectrum and 7/10 for the Amstrad CPC versions. The MSX version was rated an overall 8/10 by MSX Extra, and the Commodore 64 version was given a score of 68%  by Zzap!64. Your Sinclair rated the ZX Spectrum version 9/10, but the 1990 re-release edition from Alternative Software, which featured a sanitised version of the original cover described as "tragically modified", was given only 52% for its very high difficulty level.

Legacy
Game Over was followed by Game Over II (also known as Phantis in its native Spain), which was developed and published by Dinamic Software in 1987.

References

External links

Game Over at Lemon64
Game Over at Amstrad ESP
Game Over at CPCZone
Game Over at Generation-MSX

1987 video games
Action video games
Amstrad CPC games
Commodore 64 games
Dinamic Software games
Europe-exclusive video games
MSX games
Single-player video games
Science fiction video games
Video games about robots
Video games scored by Martin Galway
Video games developed in Spain
ZX Spectrum games
Video games set in prison
Alternative Software games